"On the Ride" is a song recorded by American pop rock duo Aly & AJ, released as the sixth single from their debut album Into the Rush. It was also released with their 2006 Disney Channel Original Movie Cow Belles, in which the girls play the starring roles. Its music video features scenes from the movie merged in it and this song is featured in the movie. Their first live concert DVD On the Ride is named after this song.

Track listing

References

2006 singles
Aly & AJ songs
Songs written by Adam Watts (musician)
2005 songs
Hollywood Records singles
Songs written by Andy Dodd
Songs written by Aly Michalka
Songs written by AJ Michalka